The International Gorilla Conservation Programme (IGCP) was formed in 1991 to ensure that the critically endangered mountain gorillas are conserved in their habitat in the mountain forests of the Virunga Massif in Rwanda, Uganda and the Democratic Republic of the Congo.

Origins

The programme grew out of the work of Dian Fossey, who began to study Rwandan mountain gorillas in the 1960s. 
African Wildlife Foundation (AWF) President Robinson McIlvaine later said that "There would be no mountain gorillas in the Virungas today ... were it not for Dian Fossey's tireless efforts over many years".
McIlvaine initiated formation of the Mountain Gorilla Project in 1979, the predecessor to the IGCP, while he was president of the AWF.
Rosalind and Conrad Aveling were the first people to manage the Mountain Gorilla Project in Virunga National Park and Rosalind wrote the original proposal for IGCP. The International Gorilla Conservation Programme was formally established in 1991 by the AWF, Fauna & Flora International and the World Wide Fund for Nature.

During the ongoing and linked conflicts of the Rwandan Civil War (1990-1993) followed by the Rwandan genocide of 1994 and the Second Congo War (1998-2003) the best that could be done was to attempt to support park workers, many of whom lost their lives.

Activities
The International Gorilla Conservation Programme works with the Rwanda Development Board, the Uganda Wildlife Authority and the Institut Congolais pour la Conservation de la Nature. The IGCP tries to gain support for conservation among the local communities, and to ensure that the protected area authorities collaborate with these local communities. 
Among other activities, the IGCP works with Virunga Artisans, which markets handmade products of artisans who live near the Volcanoes, Mgahinga and Bwindi National Parks.
A census of mountain gorillas in the Virunga Massif in March and April 2010 showed that there had been a 26.3% increase in the population over the past seven years, an encouraging sign that conservation efforts were succeeding.

See also
Mgahinga Gorilla National Park
Bwindi Impenetrable National Park
Rwenzori Mountains National Park
Virunga National Park
Volcanoes National Park

References

Sources

External links
 Mountain Gorilla Conservation Partner
 Rwanda Gorilla Trekking Tours

Gorillas
Primate conservation
Nature conservation in the Democratic Republic of the Congo
Nature conservation in Uganda
Nature conservation organisations based in Rwanda
Animal welfare organisations based in the Democratic Republic of the Congo
Animal welfare organisations based in Rwanda
Virunga Mountains
Virunga National Park
Environmental organizations established in 1991
Scientific organizations established in 1991
1991 establishments in Rwanda
1991 establishments in Uganda
1990s establishments in the Democratic Republic of the Congo